Rardin is an unincorporated community in Morgan Township, Coles County, Illinois, United States.

Geography

References 

Unincorporated communities in Coles County, Illinois
Unincorporated communities in Illinois